The Moldovan Super Liga is an association football league that is currently the top division of Moldovan football league system. The competition was established in 1992, when the country became independent from the Soviet Union. It was formed in place of former Soviet republican competitions that existed since 1945. Before the Soviet occupation of Bessarabia and Northern Bukovina in 1940, clubs from modern Moldova competed in the Romanian football competitions, particularly Nistru Chișinău.

There are currently eight teams in the competition. At the end of the season, the bottom club is relegated to the Moldovan Liga 1 and replaced by the lower league's champion.

Sheriff Tiraspol—located in Transnistria—is the most successful league club with 20 titles, and is followed by Zimbru Chișinău with eight wins. Dacia Chișinău, FC Tiraspol and Milsami Orhei also conquered the title on one occasion.

Former names
 Superliga – 1992
 Liga Națională – 1992—1996
 Divizia Națională – 1996—2022
 Super Liga – 2022—present

Clubs
2022–23 clubs
CSF Bălți
FC Dinamo-Auto Tiraspol
Dacia Buiucani
FC Milsami Orhei
FC Petrocub Hîncești
FC Sfîntul Gheorghe
FC Sheriff Tiraspol
FC Zimbru Chișinău

UEFA ranking
UEFA League Ranking for the 2024-25 European football season. (Previous season rank in italics)

29  (26)  Azerbaijan Premier League
30  (29)  Kazakhstan Premier League
31  (31)  Slovenian PrvaLiga
32  (33)  Moldovan National Division
33  (39)  Football Superleague of Kosovo
34  (49)  Liechtenstein Football Cup
35  (38)  Virslīga

UEFA Club Ranking for the 2022-23 European football season.  (Previous season rank in italics)
81  (72) Sheriff Tiraspol
197  (275) Petrocub Hîncești
250  (297) Milsami Orhei
325  (355) Sfîntul Gheorghe
367  (366) Dinamo-Auto
368  (367) Speranța Nisporeni
369  (368) Zaria Bălți

(see UEFA coefficients full list for more information)

Winners

Performance by club

 bold clubs playing in the first league
 italic clubs are dissolved

Clean sheets

Top assist

Disciplinary

All-time table

The table lists the place each team took in each of the seasons. Teams in bold are currently playing in Moldovan National Division (2022-23 season).

For clubs that have been renamed, their name at the time of their most recent season in the Divizia Nationala is given. The current members are listed in bold.
Includes championship play-offs, don't includes relegation play-offs.
For the purposes of this table, each win is worth 3 points. The three-point system was adopted in 1995.

Republican winners (being a part USSR) 

1945 : Dinamo Chișinău
1946 : Dinamo Chișinău
1947 : Dinamo Chișinău
1948 : Dinamo Chișinău
1949 : Burevestnik Bender
1950 : Krasnoe Znamia Chișinău
1951 : Krasnoe Znamia Chișinău
1952 : Dinamo Chișinău
1953 : Dinamo Chișinău
1954 : KSKhI Chișinău
1955 : Burevestnik Bender
1956 : Spartak Tiraspol
1957 : KSKhI Chișinău
1958 : Moldavkabel' Bender
1959 : NIISVIV Chișinău
1960 : Tiraspol
1961 : KSKhI Chișinău
1962 : Universitet Chișinău
1963 : Temp Tiraspol
1964 : Temp Tiraspol'
1965 : Energhia Tiraspol
1966 : Stroindustria Bălți
1967 : Nistrul Bender
1968 : Temp Tiraspol
1969 : Politehnik Chișinău
1970 : Politehnik Chișinău
1971 : Pișcevik Bender
1972 : Kolhoz im. Lenina Edineț
1973 : Pișcevik Bender
1974 : Dinamo Chișinău
1975 : Dinamo Chișinău
1976 : Stroitel Tiraspol
1977 : Stroitel Tiraspol
1978 : Nistru Tiraspol
1979 : Nistru Ciobruciu
1980 : Nistru Ciobruciu
1981 : Grănicerul Glodeni
1982 : Grănicerul Glodeni
1983 : Grănicerul Glodeni
1984 : Grănicerul Glodeni
1985 : Iskra-Stal
1986 : Avangard Lazovsk
1987 : Tekstilshchik Tiraspol
1988 : Tighina Bender
1989 : Tekstilshchik Tiraspol
1990 : Moldovgidromaș Chișinău
1991 : Speranța Nisporeni

Source RSSSF
Source lena-dvorkina

Participating clubs

District's who not participate in Divizia Nationala: Anenii Noi, Cantemir, Călărași, Cimișlia, Criuleni, Dondușeni, Drochia, Edineț, Glodeni, Rezina, Soroca, Șoldănești, Taraclia, Telenești
Transinstrian districts who not participate in Divizia Nationala: Grigoriopol

References

External links
 Official website

 
1
Moldova
Football
1992 establishments in Moldova
Sports leagues established in 1992